Firearm magazines are used "jungle style" if they are fixed together side by side, often with tape. The spare magazine may be pointing downwards in relation to the one fitted to the weapon.

This configuration is used to speed up the process of reloading, since a loaded magazine is attached to the one in use. Disadvantages include an increase in the risk of stoppages due to the exposure of the rounds and magazine lips to dirt (particularly if the second magazine is inverted), possible loss of ammunition, and that the extra length of two magazines together can raise the profile of a soldier in the prone position.  

To counter these drawbacks, some manufactures, such as SIG and Heckler & Koch, have designed magazines with studs and cradles which permit extra ammunition to be carried parallel mated in an upright position without the need for tape or clamps. Ram-Line high-capacity magazines for Ruger 10/22 semi-automatic .22 LR rifles are also equipped with pins and sockets to allow them to be coupled together.

History

The practice of "jungle style" magazines originated in World War II for the M1 carbine, M3 "Grease Gun" and Thompson submachine gun.  Audie Murphy, one of the most decorated American combat soldiers of World War II, was reported to have utilized taped M1 carbine magazines.

Thompson submachine gun users frequently taped two 20-round magazines together to speed reloads and compensate for the limited capacity. This spurred official development of the 30-round Thompson magazine, which included the experiment of welding two 20-round magazines face-to-face (dropped in favor of the 30-round magazine). The United Defense M42 submachine gun was occasionally issued with two 20-round magazines welded face-to-face.

Taping magazines together in order to speed up reloading became so common among troops using the M1 Carbine that the U.S. military experimented with the "Holder, Magazine T3-A1", which came to be referred to by some infantrymen as the "Jungle Clip". This metal clamp holds two M1 Carbine 30-round magazines together without the need for tape.

Image gallery

References

Magazines (firearms)
Firearm terminology